Acrochordonichthys pachyderma is a species of catfish of the family Akysidae. It is found in Borneo. A detailed discussion of this species's relationship with the other members of its genus can be found on Acrochordonichthys.

References

Akysidae
Freshwater fish of Indonesia
Freshwater fish of Malaysia
Endemic fauna of Borneo
Fish described in 1902